Balearic Islands expedition may refer to:
1113–1115 Balearic Islands expedition
Ottoman raid on the Balearic islands (1501)
Ottoman invasion of the Balearic islands (1558)

See also
Invasion of Minorca
Battle of Majorca